The Ukraine one hundred-hryvnia bill (₴100) is one of the most common banknotes of the Ukrainian hryvnia; it is the main banknote dispensed from Ukrainian automatic banking machines (ABMs). The newest olive-coloured version was released to the general public on 20 February 2006, replacing the banknote from the Second UAH Series, with Taras Shevchenko's self-portrait on the face and the Chernecha Hill near Dnieper in Cherkasy and the figures of a blind kobzar with his guide boy.

History

Banknotes of Ukraine
One-hundred-base-unit banknotes